Eric Price (born July 19, 1974) is an American actor and comedian who is most notable for his membership in the recurring cast of comedians on sketch comedy series MADtv during its 14th Season. He is also known for his voice roles as Paddy and Mooch in Alpha and Omega, its first sequel and Alpha and Omega: The Series.

Biography

Early years
Price was born on July 19, 1974, in Bay View, Wisconsin. He worked at ComedySportz for several years in Milwaukee before making it to Hollywood. During his years in Milwaukee, Price appeared for a number of years with the seminal improv troupe The Dead Alewives, several members of which have gone on to entertainment industry acclaim since the group's dissolution.

Career

MADtv
Price joined the cast of MADtv in 2008 as a feature performer for the show's final season on FOX (season 14; 2008–2009 season). Despite not being featured much in episodes, Price had a recurring character (Darnell, the effeminate gay student in Coach Hines' gym class) and some memorable celebrity impressions (Don Knotts' Barney Fife from The Andy Griffith Show, Gordon Ramsey, Warren Buffett, Robert De Niro, Tim Gunn, Caroll Spinney (as his character Big Bird from Sesame Street, taking over for Jordan Peele following his departure the previous season) and Kevin Jonas of The Jonas Brothers).

Characters

Impressions

Other projects
Price also made a voice role in the computer animated comedy-drama, Alpha and Omega. The film was released on September 17, 2010. He also reprised his role in Alpha and Omega 2: A Howl-iday Adventure, which came out on October 8, 2013.

Filmography

Movie appearances

Television appearances

Video games

References

External links

MADtv fan site

1974 births
Living people
American male comedians
21st-century American comedians
American male television actors
Male actors from Milwaukee
American sketch comedians